Jon Godel was the Editor of IRN. He was appointed Editor of IRN in 1998, moving back to radio after a period in television news.

He was employed by ITN until 2009, and was responsible for the delivery of IRN content to radio stations across the UK with an approximate daily audience of 26 million listeners.   The last bulletin was broadcast from ITN at 1300 by Moira Alderson on Tuesday 3 March 2009 before BSkyB took over the IRN contract.

Jon Godel expanded his role at ITN to take in Multimedia with a brief to develop new business in the mobile phone and radio environments while helping to drive uptake of new 3G services developed by the ITN Multimedia Department, which has now been rebranded ITN ON.

Jon Godel started life as a reporter and news editor within local newspapers and a presenter at Hospital Radio Bedford where he later became Programme Controller and then Chairman. Professionally he moved on to become Head of News at Northants 96 where he also co-presented the breakfast show with Tim Allen. He moved on to head up Kiss FM's news output and read Kiss London breakfast updates under the pseudonym of Clark Kent in the mid 1990s. After ITN lost the contract with IRN Jon decided to leave Journalism. He is now based in East Anglia.

References

Living people
Year of birth missing (living people)
British male journalists